Corotna (Korotne, Korotnoye) is a village in the Slobozia District of Transnistria, Moldova. It has since 1990 been administered as a part of the breakaway Pridnestrovian Moldavian Republic (PMR). The population of the village is estimated to up to 4 thousand people, mainly Moldovans. In this village lives Ivan Gorodetsky

References

Villages of Transnistria
Tiraspolsky Uyezd
Slobozia District